Man-Made Women is a 1928 American silent comedy-drama film directed by Paul L. Stein and starring Leatrice Joy. It was produced by Cecil B. DeMille and Ralph Block and distributed through Pathé Exchange.

Cast
Leatrice Joy as Nan Payson
H. B. Warner as Jules Moret
John Boles as John Payson
Seena Owen as Georgette
Jay Eaton as Garth
Jeanette Loff as Marjorie
Sidney Bracey as Owens

Preservation
The film is preserved at the Library of Congress.

References

External links

1928 films
American silent feature films
Films directed by Paul L. Stein
American black-and-white films
1920s English-language films
1928 comedy-drama films
Pathé Exchange films
1920s American films
Silent American comedy-drama films